The Norwegian and Swedish Romanisæl Travellers are a group or branch of the Romani people who have been resident in Norway and Sweden for some 500 years. The estimated number of Romanisael Travellers in Sweden is 65,000, while in Norway, the number is probably about 10,000.

Origins
By history and culture, they are related to British Romani Groups, such as English Romanichals, Welsh Kale and Scottish Gypsy and Traveller groups.

Modern-day Romanisael (Tater) Travellers are the descendants of the first Romanies who arrived in Scandinavia during the 16th century. Most were deportees from Britain to Norway, but small numbers came via Denmark. Norwegian and Swedish Romani identify as Romanisæl, this word has origins in the Angloromani word Romanichal, Romanichal is the word English Romani and Scottish Border Romani and Southern Welsh Romani use to identify themselves with.

A related group are the Finnish Kale, descendants of early Scandinavian Romanies who were deported in the 17th century from Sweden proper to Finland. The Finnish Kale, however, maintain that their ancestors had originally come from Scotland, They and other Scandinavian Romanisæl Travellers are related to present-day Romanichal Travellers of England and Scotland.

Romanisæl Travellers in Norway at times have been confused with the indigenous Norwegian Travellers, although they perceive the latter group to be non-Romanies by culture and origins.

Names for the group

By the settled majority population, the Norwegian Travellers are known as Romanifolk or the exonym tatere, and in Sweden they used to be called the similar exonym  tattare, but are named officially under the term Roma today, while the endonyms in use are "dinglare" or " resande". Norwegian travellers most often use the endonyms "reisendes" or "vandriar". Both exonymous terms hint to the original misconception that these people were Tatars. Before the turn of the 20th century, the majority population made little distinction between tatere/tattare and "Gypsies"; this situation changed mainly due to the arrival of Kalderash Roma from Russia and Central Europe in the last decades of the 19th century, to whom the latter term came to be applied almost exclusively.

Skojare was a former name for Travellers in Sweden; in Norway skøyere was associated with indigenous Travellers. Fant or Fanter was another term formerly applied to both Romani and non-Romani Travellers in southern Norway. A lot of these terms nowadays are considered pejorative due to their connotation of vagabondage and vagrancy.

In Sweden, tattare is now considered a disparaging term and has been completely abandoned in official use. Since 2000 Swedish Travellers are officially referred to as resande (Travellers), and counted as one of several groups within the "Roma" national minority. They often refer to themselves as resandefolket (Travelling people), or dinglare. Less common is the term tavringar. In recent years there has been an attempt to term Swedish Travellers as tschiwi, but this usage is contested.

For Norwegian Travellers, however, the name tatere is severely disputed. For one part it does not carry the same stigma as in Sweden, the counterpart has for many years fought for the same rights as Swedish Romani; some Traveller organizations maintain this term in their official names. In Norway the Travellers are categorized as a national minority group, officially referred to as romanifolk or tatere, reisende (Travellers). Norwegian Travellers refer to themselves by various names, such as romany, romanoar, romanisæl, vandriar (Wanderers), etc. In contrast to Sweden, in Norway a distinction is made between romanifolket and rom (i.e., Roma groups that arrived since the 19th century) in the official legislation on national minorities.

Language
The Travellers in Sweden and Norway speak a form of Para-Romani referred to as Scandoromani. Many words of the Nordic Romani origin have survived in the Scandinavian languages, both in common speech and slang. Examples from Swedish:

 tjej, meaning 'girl' (originally slang, but now a more common alternative to the older flicka)
 puffra, meaning 'gun' (used to be common slang)
 hak, meaning 'place' 'joint' or 'establishment' (used to be common slang)
 vischan, meaning 'the countryside', 'boondocks' or 'rural areas' (used to be common slang)

Organisations
Romani Travellers in Sweden and Norway have founded organisations for preserving their culture and lobbying for their collective rights. One example is Föreningen Resandefolkets Riksorganisation, based in Malmö, Sweden.

Media
Romani Posten (also Romaniposten, The Romani Post) was a news magazine for the Romani Traveller community in Norway. It had no political or religious affiliation, and published articles in Norwegian. At its most frequent, it came out eight times per year. On 6 September 2003, it was founded as an on-line publication; the first print edition was published in October 2006. Jone Pedersen was the founding publisher and editor-in-chief. As of 2007, it had ceased publication.

References

Sources, further reading
 
 
 Andrej Kotljarchuk (2019) STATE, EXPERTS, AND ROMA: Historian Allan Etzler and pseudo-scientific racism in Sweden, Scandinavian Journal of History.

External links
 
 

Ethnic groups in Norway
Ethnic groups in Sweden
Romani in Norway
Romani in Sweden
Romanichal